Rope Around the Neck is a Canadian crime drama film, directed by Pierre Patry and released in 1965. Based on a novel by Claude Jasmin, the film stars Guy Godin as Léo Longpré, a man who is on the run from the police after murdering his mistress Suzanne (Andrée Lachapelle).

The cast also includes Henri Norbert, Jean Duceppe, Denise Pelletier, Tania Fédor, Guy L'Écuyer and Jean-Louis Millette.

The film was not well-received by critics, which contributed to Patry's decision to stop making narrative films.

References

External links
 

1965 films
Canadian crime drama films
Quebec films
French-language Canadian films
1960s Canadian films
1965 crime drama films
Films based on Canadian novels